George Robinson MBE (born 30 May 1941) is a Democratic Unionist Party (DUP) politician in Northern Ireland, who was a Member of the Northern Ireland Assembly (MLA) for East Londonderry from 2003 until 2022. He was previously a civil servant and was also elected to Limavady Borough Council in 1985, where he served for nearly 30 years before stepping down in 2013.

Life and career
Robinson was born in Limavady, County Londonderry to Joe, a soldier in both World War I and World War II, and Jane Robinson. George is the eldest of eight siblings; he has five brothers and two sisters. His father died of tuberculosis in 1964 and his mother at a "fairly young" age, leaving George to look after his siblings.

He was educated at Limavady Technical College. During the Troubles, he served in the army barracks.

Robinson was elected Mayor of Limavady Borough Council in June 2002. Robinson welcomed a visit from the Queen and Duke of Edinburgh, saying, "Last Tuesday and Wednesday were special days in Northern Ireland".

In 2004, he suffered a serious heart attack and subsequently underwent a double heart bypass.

On 17 March 2022, citing his age as a factor, Robinson announced that he would be retiring as an MLA at the 2022 Assembly election In a statement, he said: "At the last election I contested in 2017 and at the ripe old age of 75 it was said by a Nationalist opponent; 'when will we ever get rid of Robinson?' Well, the time has now arrived for this Robinson to move on, only by virtue of retirement, but like Unionism across the Province, I bow out unbroken and I bow out undefeated."

References

External links
 NI Assembly webpage

1941 births
Living people
Members of Limavady Borough Council
Democratic Unionist Party MLAs
Northern Ireland MLAs 2003–2007
Northern Ireland MLAs 2007–2011
Northern Ireland MLAs 2011–2016
Northern Ireland MLAs 2016–2017
Northern Ireland MLAs 2017–2022
Mayors of places in Northern Ireland
Members of the Order of the British Empire